Honey Come Back is an LP album by Patti Page, released by Columbia Records in 1970, under catalog number CS 9999.

The album was reissued, combined with the 1967 Patti Page album Today My Way, in compact disc format by Collectables Records on November 25, 2003. In addition, three bonus tracks were added to the CD: "Up, Up and Away" and "On the Other Side" (after the 11 tracks of Today My Way) and "Toy Balloon" (after the tracks from this album).

Track listing

Patti Page albums
Columbia Records albums
1970 albums